New York City Fire Department Rescue Company 1, also known as Rescue 1, is one of five special operations rescue companies of the New York City Fire Department (FDNY) that responds to rescue operations that require specialized equipment and training. It was organized on March 8, 1915.

Organization
The members of rescue companies receive extensive training in many courses from the Special Operations Command (SOC) of the FDNY. Additionally, many of the members have many years of experience within the FDNY and/or other fields of emergency operations. The rescue companies have an emphasis on equipping the company with tools that could be instrumental in performing rescues of civilians and firefighters at structural fires as well as operating at "odd jobs". Early versions of self-contained breathing apparatus (SCBA) were first assigned to the rescue companies. Heavy duty lifting equipment, torches, and saws were initially introduced to the rescue companies. Lyle guns were among the initial equipment used by rescue companies, and as technology evolved, the companies were instrumental in pioneering the fire service application of artificial resuscitation techniques, SCBA, and firefighting foam. Rescue 1 is staffed with one captain, three lieutenants, and typically 25 to 30 firefighters that are split into tours (shifts).

Coverage
Rescue 1 services the New York City borough of Manhattan below 116th Street in East Harlem and 125th Street in Morningside Heights and Harlem. Rescue 3 in the Bronx covers the areas of far northern Manhattan. Rescue 1's firehouse is located on 530 West 43rd Street in the Hell's Kitchen neighborhood.

History

Rescue 1's firehouse was destroyed in 1985 by a fire in a neighboring warehouse. Rescue 1 was already out on a call when fire collapsed the warehouse onto their quarters. The unit then temporarily relocated until 1989 when their present firehouse was finished. Their distinctive door was saved and relocated to the back of the building.
During the September 11 attacks, the company responded to the North Tower, and lost nearly half its company. In the 2002 documentary 9/11, they are one of first units entering the stairwell of the building. In 2002, rescue trucks designed by the company's captain Terry Hatton, who died in the attacks, were incorporated into the department's fleet, with his characteristic exclamation "Outstanding" printed on the front of Rescue 1's vehicle. The subsequent 2007 Pierce rig had the same inscription with "T.H." added next to the motto. In 2005, the section of West 43rd Street between Tenth and Eleventh Avenues where the company's firehouse is located was named Terence S. Hatton Way.

Rescue 1 celebrated their centennial on March 8, 2015.

References

External links 

Rescue 1
1915 establishments in New York City
Fire service special operations